Dilawar Figar, (8 July 1929 – 25 January 1998) was a Pakistani humorist and poet. He was known as  Shehansha-e-Zarafat (King of humor) and Akbar-e-Sani (named after the late poet Akbar Allahabadi) for his satire and humour.

Early life and career
Dilawar Figar was born as Dilawar Hussain on July 8, 1929 in Badaun, Uttar Pradesh, British India. He received his early education in his hometown, and later joined Agra University where he received his M.A. degree in (Urdu). He also did his M.A. in (English) and M.A. in (Economics). He associated himself with the teaching profession.

He migrated to Pakistan from India in 1968 and settled in Karachi. He joined Abdullah Haroon College as a teacher, where the renowned poet Faiz Ahmed Faiz was the principal at that time. Figar taught Urdu literature there. He also worked for Karachi Development Authority as an Assistant Director-Town Planning.

Death and legacy
Dilawar Figar died on 25 January 1998 in Karachi at age 68. During a literary gathering on 31 January 1993 at Karachi Arts Council, he himself once described his imaginary death and how he left for the heavens and was refused entry into paradise by the guard angels because he had arrived before his scheduled time. The guard angels asked him to come back after five years and sent him back to earth. The audience laughed it off at that time but he proved to be approximately right about his actual time of death – nearly 5 years later.

Contribution to Urdu literature 
Figar started writing in 1942 at the age of fourteen and soon got help of fellow writers, Maulvi Jam Nawai Badayuni, Maulana Jami Badayuni. His literary work contain Ghazals, humorous poems, and their translation in English:
 Mein Apna Vote Kis Ko Doon?- This witty poem became very popular during the 1970 General Elections in Pakistan
Haadisay (collections of Ghazals)
Sitam Zarifiañ (collections of humor poetry)
Shamat-e-Aamaal (collections of humor poetry)
Aadaab Arz (collections of humor poetry)
Assar-e-Nau (collections of humor)
Unglian Figar Apni (collections of humor poetry)
Matla Arz Hai (collections of humor poetry)
Century (collections of humor poetry)
Khuda Jhoot Na Bulwa'ay (collections of humor poetry)
Chiragh-e-Khandañ (collections of humor poetry)
Aaina-e-Raghib (125 rubaiyaat of Raghib Muradabadi)
Khushbu Ka Safar (translation of selected English and American poetry)
Khoob Tar Kahan (translation of 'Why Not the Best' – biography of President Jimmy Carter)
Aabshar-e-Noor (poetic explanation of Sura Fatiha)
Sila-e-Shaheed Kia Hai ? (poetic biography of  recipients of Nishan-e-Haider martyrs)
Fi Sabeel Lillah (collections of humor poetry)
Kaha Suna Maaf Karna (collections of humor poetry)

See also
 Urdu
 Progressive Writers' Movement
 List of Urdu writers
 List of Urdu poets

References

External links

1929 births
1998 deaths
Muhajir people
Pakistani poets
Urdu-language poets from Pakistan
Poets from Karachi
20th-century poets
Recipients of the Pride of Performance